George Onorato (November 5, 1928 – February 21, 2015) was an American politician from New York.

Life
Onorato was born on November 5, 1928, in Astoria, Queens, New York City. He graduated from Long Island City High School. He served in the 118th Medical Battalion of the U.S. Army from 1950 to 1952. He married Athena Georgakakos, and they had three children.

He was Secretary and Treasurer of Local 41 of the International Union of Bricklayers and Allied Craftworkers for 15 years, and entered politics as a Democrat.

On June 28, 1983, he was elected to the New York State Senate, to fill the vacancy caused by the appointment of Anthony V. Gazzara as Chairman of the New York State Liquor Authority. Onorato was re-elected several times, and remained in the State Senate until 2010, sitting in the 185th, 186th, 187th, 188th, 189th, 190th, 191st, 192nd, 193rd, 194th, 195th, 196th, 197th and 198th New York State Legislatures. He was Vice Chair of the Minority Conference, Co-chair of the New York State Armed Forces Legislative Caucus, and Co-Chairman of the New York State Senate Democratic Task Force on Energy & Conservation. He generally opposes same-sex marriage legislation. He is a member of New York State Senate Democratic Puerto Rican and Hispanic Task Force, the Senate Minority Task Force on Vietnam Veterans, and the Senate Minority Task Force on Waterfront Development.

On December 2, 2009, Onorato voted against same-sex marriage legislation, which failed to pass the Senate.

Onorato announced on January 11, 2010, that he would not be a candidate for re-election.

He died on February 21, 2015, in East Elmhurst, Queens.

References

Democratic Party New York (state) state senators
1928 births
2015 deaths
People from Astoria, Queens
21st-century American politicians